Ḍiyā’ al-Dīn Abu ‘Abdallah Muhammad ibn ‘Abd al-Wahid al-Sa‘di al-Hanbali (569–643 AH; 1173−1245 AD) was a Hanbali Islamic scholar.

Biography
Diya' al-Din was born in Damascus in 1173. His parents had emigrated from Nablus in the crusader Kingdom of Jerusalem shortly before his birth, along with 155 of other Hanbali inhabitants of the area, in response to perceived threats against their shaykhs from the crusader lord of Nablus, Baldwin of Ibelin. Al-Dhahabi described him as the Sheikh of hadith scholars. He recorded Maqdisi's death in the year 1245 C.E., 643 A.H.

He was a relative of Abd al-Ghani al-Maqdisi, as his grandmother and Abd al-Ghani al-Maqdisi's mother were sisters, while Ibn Qudamah was his maternal uncle.

Works
 : a collection of anecdotes about the shaykhs of the Nablus area prior to the mass immigration of Hanbalis to Damascus. Diya al-Din collected the stories from his older relatives who had also lived there
 Al-Āhādith al-Jiyād al-Mukhtārah min mā laysa fī Ṣaḥīḥain: a collection of hadith arranged by the name of the Companion narrating each hadith, in alphabetical order. He was unable to complete it. He intended to include only authentic hadith a goal which, to a large extent, he accomplished.
A short treatise, Ikhtisās al-Qurʾān Bi ʿAwdihī ilā al-Rahīm al-Rahmān, a book bringing together the ahādīth and narrations pertaining to the Qur'an being erased from this Earth and returning to Allāh.
As-Sunan wal-Ahkam `un il-Mustafa Alaihi Afdal us-Salati was-Salam
Fada'il Al A'amaal: a collection of hadith highlighting the virtues of various actions, such as prayer, fasting, charity, and visiting the sick. His book is not to be confused with the similarly titled Fazail-e-Amaal by Muhammad Zakariyya al-Kandhlawi.

See also
 Hanbali (nesbat), disambiguation page listing other uses of Hanbali as a nisba (nesbat)
 Maqdisi (nesbat), describing this nisba (onomastics)

References

Bibliography
 

Hadith scholars
13th-century Muslim scholars of Islam
Hanbalis
1245 deaths
1173 births
13th-century jurists
13th-century Arabs